The Galeria Kaufhof Pokal Challenge was a golf tournament on the Challenge Tour that was played at Golfclub Rittergut Birkhof in Korschenbroich, Germany from 2001 to 2005.

Winners

References

External links
Coverage on the Challenge Tour's official site

Former Challenge Tour events
Golf tournaments in Germany